William J. Guard (March 29, 1862 – March 3, 1932) was an Irish-born American opera publicist.

Biography
He was born in Limerick on March 29, 1862. Guard was brought to the United States as a child, later being educated there.  He worked as a journalist for numerous important newspapers for some time, and was engaged by the Manhattan Opera Company as a press representative upon its organization in 1906.  Upon the company's dissolution, he took a similar position with the Metropolitan Opera, remaining with the company until his death.  In recognition for his activities on behalf of Italian singers he was awarded the Order of the Crown of Italy by the Italian government. Guard died in New York City on March 3, 1932.

References
David Ewen, Encyclopedia of the Opera: New Enlarged Edition.  New York; Hill and Wang, 1963.

1862 births
1932 deaths
American male journalists
Irish emigrants to the United States (before 1923)